The 2013 ITU Triathlon World Cup was a series of triathlon races organised by the International Triathlon Union (ITU) for elite-level triathletes held during the 2013 season. For 2013, Ten races were announced as part of the World Cup series. Each race was held over a distance of 1500 m swim, 40 km cycle, 10 km run (an Olympic-distance triathlon). Alongside a prize purse, points were awarded at each race contributing towards the overall point totals.

Triathlon World Cup schedule

Event results

Mooloolaba

Ishigaki

Huatulco

Edmonton

Palamos

Tiszaújváros

Alicante

Cozumel

Tongyeong

Guatapé

See also
2013 ITU World Triathlon Series

References

2013
World Cup